Aframomum wuerthii is a species of plant in the ginger family, Zingiberaceae. It was first described by Jean-Baptiste Dhetchuvi and Eberhard Fischer.

References 

wuerthii